The Nikon F-601m is a manual focus, autoexposure, auto film loading and advancing 35 mm SLR camera manufactured by the Nikon Corporation and released in 1990. It was sold in USA as the N6000.

The F-601m is a simplified version of the F-601, with no autofocus capability, no spot metering and no built-in flash.

Features 

 Flexible programmed (P), aperture priority (A) and shutter priority (S) auto-exposure and manual exposure control.
 Matrix and Center-Weighted Metering.
 Auto-exposure bracketing.
 Self-timer.
 High or low speed continuous film advance.
 DX film code recognition to automatically set ISO speed.
 Exposure and flash compensation.
 TTL flash exposure.

Construction 

 Polycarbonate (plastic) exterior.
 Metal lens mount.

Lens Compatibility

 CPU lenses required for full compatibility.
 Manual focus lenses lose P & S modes, matrix metering, and aperture display in the finder
 Pre-AI and IX lenses not supported
 G-type lenses will work in P & S modes, and only smallest aperture in A & M modes.
 DX lenses will be vignetted, otherwise same as G-type
 VR functionality not supported

References 

F601m
F601m